Dmeide is a Bedouin village in northern Israel. Located in the Galilee near Kafr Manda, it falls under the jurisdiction of Misgav Regional Council.

The village was established during the 17th century, but was only recognised by Israel in 1995.

References

See also
Arab localities in Israel
Bedouin in Israel

Arab villages in Israel
Bedouin localities in Israel
Populated places established in the 17th century
Populated places in Northern District (Israel)